Terina is a genus of moths in the family Geometridae erected by Francis Walker in 1854.

Species
Some species of this genus are:
Terina albidaria (Fabricius, 1787)
Terina charmione (Fabricius, 1793)
Terina chrysoptera Hampson, 1909
Terina circumcincta L. B. Prout, 1915
Terina circumdata (Walker, 1865)
Terina crocea Hampson, 1910
Terina doleris (Plötz, 1880)
Terina flaviorsa (L. B. Prout, 1934)
Terina internata (Warren, 1909)
Terina latifascia Walker, 1854
Terina maculifera Strand, 1911
Terina niphanda Druce, 1887
Terina ochricosta (Rebel, 1914) 
Terina octogesa (Druce, 1887)
Terina overlaeti L. B. Prout, 1932
Terina puncticorpus Warren, 1897
Terina reliqua L. B. Prout, 1925
Terina renifera Warren, 1897
Terina rogersi  L. B. Prout, 1915
Terina sanguinarea Bethune-Baker, 1911
Terina subfulva (Warren, 1905)
Terina tanyeces L. B. Prout, 1921
Terina wardi Sharpe, 1891

References

Walker, F. (1854). List of the Specimens of Lepidopterous Insects in the Collection of the British Museum. Part II.– Lepidoptera Heterocera. 2:i–iv, 279–581.

Ennominae
Geometridae genera